Lewis Nicolson (born 5 May 2004) is a Scottish professional footballer who currently plays as a defender for  Inverness Caledonian Thistle.

Club career 
Nicolson started his career rising through the youth ranks at Inverness Caledonian Thistle, before joining the first team on 1 July 2021.

Nicolson made his first team debut on 29 January 2022 coming on as a late substitute for Cameron Harper in a 1–0 away loss to Kilmarnock. He scored his first, and the only goal in a 1–2 home loss to Ayr United on 19 February 2022.

On 16 August 2022, Nicolson moved to Elgin City on a half season loan, making his debut a few days later in a 2–2 draw at home to Stranraer. On 29 October 2022, Nicolson received his first red card of his career, coming in the 7th minute of a 2–1 away defeat to East Fife.

In January 2023, Nicolson was recalled from his loan to Elgin due to an injury crisis at Inverness. He made his return to the team the following day, coming on in a 6–1 home win over Cove Rangers in the Scottish Championship.

Career statistics 
As of 19 November 2022

References 

Living people
2004 births
Inverness Caledonian Thistle F.C. players
Elgin City F.C. players
Sportspeople from Inverness
Scottish footballers
Association football defenders
Scottish Professional Football League players